The Servilleta Basalt or Servilleta Formation is a geologic formation that underlies most of the Taos Plateau of northern New Mexico. It has a radiometric age of 3.6 to 4.5 million years, corresponding to the Pliocene epoch.

Description
The formation consists principally of tholeiitic olivine basalt flows with interlayered beds of alluvium. The basalt is distinctive for its olivine content (typically altered to iddingsite) and its diktytaxitic texture, in which the basalt contains microscopic laths of plagioclase that are randomly oriented and have angular spaces between grains.

Geologists have not reached consensus on whether the alluvium beds should be regarded as part of the formation. These are lithologically similar to nearby sedimentary beds of the Santa Fe Group. Those investigators who include the alluvium in the unit tend to refer to the unit as the Servilleta Formation, while those who do not tend to refer to the unit as the Servilleta Basalt.

The formation rests unconformably on the Picuris Formation, Santa Fe Group, or Hinsdale Formation. It is downfaulted against Santa Fe Group beds near Pilar and on the northeast side of the Picuris Mountains.

The lavas appear to have all been erupted from five shield volcanoes near the center of the Taos Plateau volcanic field. The shields are very gently sloping (less than 1.3 degrees) except for La Segita Peaks, which may be superimposed on an older basaltic andesite volcano. Another shield, Cerro Mojino, is steeper (11 degrees) but may be a structural dome rather than a vent. The shield volcanoes are free of spatter and cinder, indicating extremely fluid lava that erupted nonexplosively.

Economic geology
The unit can be divided into three sets of flows separated by alluvium in the southern San Luis Valley. The alluvium separating the upper two flows is a significant local aquifer known as the Agua Azul.

History of investigation
The formation was first named by A.P. Butler, Jr., in his unpublished 1946 dissertation. In 1971, Burroughs added the Mesita Member, a trachyandesite flow in the San Luis Hills, to the formation. Lipman and Menhert advocated restricting the unit to the basalt flows in 1979.

Footnotes

References
 
 
 
 
 
 
 

Neogene formations of New Mexico